Minudasht (also Romanized as Mīnūdasht; also known as Leylan, Leylīān, Līlān, Līlīan (Persian: ليليان), and Līrīan) is a village in Khorram Dasht Rural District, Kamareh District, Khomeyn County, Markazi Province, Iran. At the 2006 census, its population was 782, in 193 families.

References 

Populated places in Khomeyn County